Morten Furuly (born 13 November 1975), also known as Sanrabb, is a Norwegian black metal musician and one of the founding members of black/death metal band Gehenna.

Biography
Sanrabb formed Gehenna in 1993, together with Dolgar and Sir Vereda. He has participated on all of Gehenna's releases, both as a vocalist and as a guitarist. In addition to Gehenna, Sanrabb has played in several other extreme metal bands, and he has done session live guitars for bands such as Mayhem and Satyricon.

Associated bands

Current
Gehenna - 1993–present (vocals, guitar)
Throne of Katarsis - 2009–present (bass)

Former
Neetzach - 1993-1994 (guitar)
Forlorn - 1996-1999 (vocals)
Satyricon - 1999 (session live guitar)
Mëkanïk - 2000 (guitar)
Cobolt 60 - 2002 (session live vocals and bass)
Shadow Season - 2003 (studio guest vocals)
Mayhem - 2004 (session live guitar)
Nattefrost - 2005 (studio guest vocals)
122 Stab Wounds
The Deviant
Haggis
Blood Red Throne

Discography

Gehenna
Black Seared Heart (demo) (1993)
Ancestor of the Darkly Sky (7") (1993) 
First Spell (1994)
Seen Through the Veils of Darkness (The Second Spell) (1995)
Malice (1996)
Black Seared Heart (Re-release of the 1993 demo, with bonus tracks) (1996)
Deadlights (EP) (1998)
Adimiron Black (1998)
Murder (2000)
WW (2005)
Unravel (2013)

Neetzach
Pinseltronen (demo) (1995)

Forlorn
Forlorn (demo) (1996)
The Crystal Palace (1997)

Shadow Season
The Frozen (2003)

Nattefrost
Terrorist - Nekronaut Pt. 1 (2005)

Mëkanïk
Dër Mëkanïk Grööves (EP) (2008)

Throne of Katarsis
 Profetens siste vandring (single) (2011)
 Ved graven (2011)
 The Three Transcendental Keys (2013)

References

Living people
Black metal singers
Norwegian black metal musicians
Norwegian rock guitarists
Norwegian male singers
Norwegian rock singers
Norwegian songwriters
Norwegian heavy metal guitarists
Norwegian heavy metal singers
Musicians from Stavanger
1975 births